Lake Muskoka/Boyd Bay Water Aerodrome  is located  west of Bracebridge, Ontario, Canada.

See also

 List of airports in the Bracebridge area

References

Registered aerodromes in Ontario
Transport in Bracebridge, Ontario
Seaplane bases in Ontario